Mary Ikoku  is a Nigerian development consultant.

Early life
Ikoku is an alumnus of Abia State University where she studied English Language. She has a Master's in International Relations from Lagos State University. She studied at the University of California Davis and the London School of Public Relations. She is from Arochukwu in Abia State, Nigeria.

Career
She is the Department for Foreign Development’s (DFID)/Nigerian Infrastructure Advisory Facility (NIAF) Consultant working as the Head of Communication at the Subsidy Reinvestment and Empowerment Programme (SURE-P) of the Federal Government of Nigeria. She worked as the Lead Consultant at Access Media Ltd. She  served as Special Adviser to the Minister of Information and Communications. In this role, she implemented schemes to expand government outreach, generate funding for advocacy campaigns and refine governmental communication processes.

Working Moms

On the sidelines, she is the founder and President of Working Moms, an organization dedicated to helping women cope with the challenges created by mixing professional careers with parenthood. The organization publishes Working Moms Africa a magazine that celebrates professional mothers.

References

Living people
People from Abia State
Nigerian consultants
Abia State University alumni
Lagos State University alumni
University of California, Davis alumni
Year of birth missing (living people)